Leonardo Grifo (died 1485) was a Roman Catholic prelate who served as Archbishop of Benevento (1482–1485).

Biography
On 23 Sep 1482, Leonardo Grifo was appointed during the papacy of Pope Sixtus IV as Archbishop of Benevento.
He served as Archbishop of Benevento until his death in Oct 1485.

References

Bibliography
 Hofmann, W. Forschungen zur Geschichte der Kurialen Behörden von Schisma bis zur Reformation. Rom 1914, Band II, p. 123. (in German)

External links and additional sources
 (for Chronology of Bishops) 
 (for Chronology of Bishops) 

15th-century Roman Catholic archbishops in the Kingdom of Naples
Bishops appointed by Pope Sixtus IV
1485 deaths